Crvena Crkva (Serbian Cyrillic: Црвена Црква, meaning Red Church) is a village in Serbia. It is situated in the Bela Crkva municipality, in the South Banat District, Vojvodina province. The village has a Serb ethnic majority (93.96%) and a population of 729 people (2002 census).

External links
 https://web.archive.org/web/20100203232332/http://www.crvenacrkva.net/

Populated places in Serbian Banat
Populated places in South Banat District
Bela Crkva